In mathematics, a semigroupoid (also called semicategory, naked category or precategory) is a partial algebra that satisfies the axioms for a small category, except possibly for the requirement that there be an identity at each object. Semigroupoids generalise semigroups in the same way that small categories generalise monoids and groupoids generalise groups. Semigroupoids have applications in the structural theory of semigroups.

Formally, a semigroupoid consists of:
 a set of things called objects.
 for every two objects A and B a set Mor(A,B) of things called morphisms from A to B. If f is in Mor(A,B), we write f : A → B.
 for every three objects A, B and C a binary operation Mor(A,B) × Mor(B,C) → Mor(A,C) called composition of morphisms. The composition of f : A → B and g : B → C is written as g ∘ f or gf. (Some authors write it as fg.)

such that the following axiom holds:

 (associativity) if f : A → B, g : B → C and h : C → D then h ∘ (g ∘ f) = (h ∘ g) ∘ f.

References

Algebraic structures
Category theory